"The Upside" is a single written and recorded by violinist Lindsey Stirling.  It was released as both an instrumental track and later a collaboration featuring vocals from Elle King.

Background
"The Upside" was the second and third single released from Stirling's fifth album, Artemis.  In July 2019 it was originally released as an instrumental track purely focusing on Stirling.  Stirling performed the song on a number of occasions that summer, notably at PBS's A Capitol Fourth celebration.

This song provided inspiration for the name of Stirling's charity launched in 2020, The Upside Fund.

In August of the same year, "The Upside" was re-released with vocals by Elle King. Interviewed at the time, Stirling commented:

Music video
On September 11, 2019, Stirling released the music video for "The Upside" featuring Elle King, directed by Tom Teller and Brodin Plett.  The cinematic features Stirling as Artemis, leading an expedition from the underworld to the surface but things quickly unfold into a dystopian nightmare causing Artemis to run for her life. Amongst the story, visuals of King on vocals and Stirling on violin are shown.

Charts
"The Upside" peaked at number 13 on the US Dance/Electronic Digital Song Sales chart.

References

2019 singles
2019 songs
Lindsey Stirling songs
Elle King songs
Songs written by Mozella
Songs written by Lindsey Stirling
Songs written by Peter Hanna
Songs written by Taylor Bird (songwriter)